Cosmotoma zikani is a species of longhorn beetles of the subfamily Lamiinae. It was described by Melzer in 1927, and is known from southeastern Brazil.

References

Beetles described in 1927
Cosmotoma